Timothy Cole (185217 May 1931) was an American wood engraver.

Biography
Timothy Cole was born in 1852 in London, England, his family emigrated to the United States in 1858.

He established himself in Chicago, where in the great fire of 1871 he lost everything he possessed. In 1875, he moved to New York City, finding work on the Century (then Scribner's) magazine. Cole was associated with the magazine for 40 years as a pioneer craftsman of wood engraving.

He immediately attracted attention by his unusual facility and his sympathetic interpretation of illustrations and pictures, and his publishers sent him abroad in 1883 to engrave a set of blocks after the old masters in the European galleries. These achieved for him a brilliant success. His reproductions of Italian, Dutch, Spanish, Flemish and English pictures were published in book form with appreciative notes by the engraver himself. He published his engravings in several books: Old Italian Masters (1892), Old Dutch and Flemish Masters (1895), Old English Masters (1902), and Old Spanish Masters (1907).

Though the advent of new mechanical processes had rendered wood engraving almost a lost art and left practically no demand for the work of such craftsmen, Mr Cole was thus enabled to continue his work, and became one of the foremost contemporary masters of wood engraving. He received a medal of the first class at the Paris Exhibition of 1900, and the only grand prize given for wood engraving at the Louisiana Purchase Exposition at St Louis, Missouri, in 1904. In 1906 he was elected into the National Academy of Design as an Associate Academician, and became a full Academician in 1908.

His son, Alphaeus Philemon Cole, was a noted portraitist who is also today recognized as having been the world's oldest verified living man at the time of his death.

Collections
Art Institute of Chicago
Metropolitan Museum of Art
Smithsonian American Art Museum

Bibliography
 Anon (1911). "Timothy Cole: A Biographical Note", The Print Collector’s Quarterly, Vol 1, No. 3, p. 344.
 Cary, Elisabeth Luther (1911). "Timothy Cole and Henry Wolf: Two Masters of Modern Wood-Engraving," The Print Collector’s Quarterly, Vol 1, No. 3, p. 319.
 Cole, Timothy (1911). "Some Difficulties of Wood-Engraving," The Print Collector’s Quarterly, Vol 1, No. 3, p. 335.
 Robert Underwood, Johnson (1918). "Timothy Cole," The Art World, Vol. 3, No. 5, p. 376.

References

External links

 

1852 births
1931 deaths
AIGA medalists
American printmakers
American engravers
American wood engravers
English emigrants to the United States
Artists from London
Artists from Chicago
Artists from New York City
Members of the American Academy of Arts and Letters